The Special Olympics World Games also known as Special Olympiad are an international sporting event for participants with intellectual disabilities, organized by the IOC-recognised Special Olympics organization.

Principles 
Although local Special Olympics events and competitions are held around the world every day, the World Games are flagship events. The goal is to showcase the skills and accomplishments of people with intellectual disabilities on a global stage. The World Games feature more than a week of competitions involving thousands of athletes. Through media coverage of the Games, the stories and achievements of children and adults with intellectual disabilities are made known to millions of people worldwide.

Special Olympics World Games take place every two years and alternate between Summer and Winter Games, a schedule similar to the Olympics and Paralympics. Attracting as many as 350,000 volunteers and coaches, plus several thousands of athletes, these World Games can be the world's largest sporting event of the year.

Special Olympics athletes can compete in 32 Olympic-style summer or winter sports. The athletes are adults and children with intellectual disabilities who can range from gifted, world-class competitors to average athletes to those with limited physical ability. It's a fundamental rule of Special Olympics competitions that athletes are matched up according to their ability and age. This “divisioning” process is an effort to make every competition fair, competitive and exciting for athletes as well as fans.

History 
The first International Special Olympics Summer Games were held in Chicago, Illinois, US, in 1968, while the first International Special Olympics Winter Games were held in February 1977 in Steamboat Springs, Colorado, US. In 1991, the name was officially changed from International Special Olympics Summer/Winter Games to Special Olympics World Summer/Winter Games.

In 2011, Special Olympics World Summer Games were held on June 25 – July 4 in Athens, Greece, involving 6,000 athletes with intellectual disabilities from 170 countries.

In 2013, the Special Olympics World Winter Games were held in PyeongChang, South Korea from Jan. 29 – Feb. 5. The Host Town program, in which families host Special Olympics athletes from around the world to help them acclimate to the host country and customs, began on Jan. 26, 2013.

In 2015 Special Olympics World Summer Games . These games were the first Special Olympics World Summer Games held in the United States in 16 years since the 1999 Summer Games held in Raleigh, North Carolina.

In 2017 Special Olympics World Winter Games in Graz and Schladming in Styria, Austria. This marked a return: Salzburg and Schladming, Austria hosted the fifth Special Olympics World Winter Games in 1993. These were the first Special Olympics World Games held outside the United States. The 2017 World Winter Games were held on March 14–25, 2017.

Kazan, Russia was due to host the next World Winter Games between January 22–28, 2022. Originally to be held in Åre and Östersund, Sweden however the Swedish Government withdrew its hosting rights in December 2019 due to financial problems. The event had been postponed to January 2023 due a rise of COVID-19 cases. Following Russia's invasion of Ukraine, the event was cancelled due to logistical and athlete safety issues.

The recent Special Olympics World Summer Games were held March 14–21, 2019 in Abu Dhabi, United Arab Emirates. These were the first Special Olympics World Games to be held in the Middle East/North Africa region. Competitions were held in 24 sports.

Berlin, Germany will host the next World Summer Games between June 16–25, 2023. It will mark the first time that Germany has ever hosted the Special Olympics World Games.

Editions

Special Olympics World Summer Games

Special Olympics World Winter Games 

1 Sarajevo, Bosnia and Herzegovina, was originally selected to host the 2009 Special Olympics World Winter Games. Due to financial problems and the constant delay in reconstruction of the venues that originally hosted the 1984 Winter Olympics, Sarajevo gave up hosting the Special Olympics and Boise, Idaho, was invited to host instead.

2 It was planned that Åre and Östersund, Sweden, would host the 2021 World Winter Games between February 2 to 13, 2021. However, on December 20, 2019, it was announced that the Swedish Paralympic Committee vetoed the necessary financing for the continuity of the event in the country, invalidating a promise made during the bid process. On June 29, 2020, it was announced that Kazan would host the Winter Games in 2022.

Sports

Official summer sports 
See footnote

 Athletics (track and field)
 Badminton
 Basketball
 Bocce
 Bowling
 Cycling
 Equestrian
 Football (Soccer)
 Golf
 Gymnastics — artistic and rhythmic
 Handball
 Judo
 Powerlifting
 Roller skating
 Sailing
 Softball
 Swimming
 Table tennis
 Tennis
 Volleyball

Official winter sports 
See footnote

 Alpine skiing
 Cross-country skiing
 Figure skating
 Floorball
 Floor hockey
 Short track speed skating
 Snowboarding
 Snowshoeing
 Speedskating

Recognized sports 
 Cricket
 Kayaking

Demonstration sports 
 Stick Shooting

Unified Cup (association football)

Unified Cup

2018 Unified Cup, Chicago
2022 Unified Cup, Detroit

Regional games

Zones
204 National Programs in 7 Continental Zones (Updated at 17 October,2022):

Asia Pacific Games 
In 2013, Australia hosted the first ever Special Olympics Asia Pacific Games.
 2013  Newcastle
 2025  Utsunomiya
 2029  Tianjin

Special Olympics European Games 

 1990  Strathclyde
 2014  Antwerp
 2024  Montreux, Nyon and Lausanne

USA Games
USA Games

Middle East and North Africa Games
MENA games

 1999  Egypt
 2000  Rabat
 2002  Beirut
 2004  Tunis
 2006  Dubai
 2008  Abu-Dhabi
 2010  Damascus
 2014  Cairo
 2018  United Arab Emirates
 2022:

Pan African Games
First ever Pan African Games in 2020 in Cairo, Egypt.
 2020  Cairo
 2024 TBA

Arab Games
no events.

See also 
 Ancient Olympic Games
 Deaflympics
 Flame of Hope (Special Olympics)
 Camp Shriver
 Special Olympics USA National Games

References

External links 
 Special Olympics

 
Parasports competitions
Multi-sport events
Recurring sporting events established in 1968